Sexual objectification is the act of treating a person solely as an object of sexual desire. Objectification more broadly means treating a person as a commodity or an object without regard to their personality or dignity. Objectification is most commonly examined at the level of a society, but can also refer to the behavior of individuals and is a type of dehumanization.

Although both men and women can be sexually objectified, the concept is mainly associated with the objectification of women, and is an important idea in many feminist theories and psychological theories derived from them. Many feminists argue that sexual objectification of girls and women contributes to gender inequality, and many psychologists associate objectification with a range of physical and mental health risks in women. Research suggests that the psychological effects of objectification of men are similar to those of women, leading to negative body image among men.
The concept of sexual objectification is controversial, and some feminists and psychologists have argued that at least some degree of objectification is a normal part of human sexuality.

Sexual objectification of women

General
The sexual objectification of women involves them being viewed primarily as an object of male sexual desire, rather than as a whole person.  Although opinions differ as to which situations are objectionable, many see the objectification of women taking place in the sexually oriented depictions of women in advertising, art and media, pornography, the occupations of stripping and prostitution, and women being brazenly evaluated or judged sexually or aesthetically in public spaces and events, such as beauty contests. 

Some feminists and psychologists argue that sexual objectification can lead to negative psychological effects including eating disorders, depression and sexual dysfunction, and can give women negative self-images because of the belief that their intelligence and competence are currently not being, nor will ever be, acknowledged by society. Sexual objectification of women has also been found to negatively affect women's performance, confidence, and level of position in the workplace. How objectification has affected women and society in general is a topic of academic debate, with some saying girls' understanding of the importance of appearance in society may contribute to feelings of fear, shame, and disgust during the transition to womanhood, and others saying that young women are especially susceptible to objectification, as they are often taught that power, respect, and wealth can be derived from one's outward appearance.

Sexual objectification of men

General
"Male sexual objectification" involves a man being in publicity in a sexual context. 

Instances where men may be viewed as sexualized can be in advertisements, music videos, films, television shows, beefcake calendars, women's magazines, male strip shows, and clothed female/nude male (CFNM) events. Women also purchase and consume pornography.

Within gay male communities, men are often objectified. In 2007 a study found discussing negative effects of objectification was met with considerable resistance in the community. The sexual objectification of men of color may force them to play specific roles in sexual encounters that are not necessarily of their own choosing.

Research suggests that the psychological effects of objectification on men are similar to those of women, leading to negative body image among men.

Media 
Men's bodies have become more objectified than they previously were, though because of society's established gaze on the objectification of women, the newfound objectification of men is not as widespread. Even with this increase of male objectification, men are still seen as the dominant figures and so the focus is still primarily on women.

Male sexual objectification has been found in 37% of advertisements featuring men's body parts to showcase a product. Similar to the issues of sexual objectification in women, it is common for said objectification to lead men to body shaming, eating disorders, and a drive for perfection. The continued exposure of these "ideal" men subject society to expect all men to fit this role.

Male actors featured in TV shows and movies are oftentimes in excellent shape and have the "ideal" bodies. These men often fill the leading roles. When society is subjected to men who do not have ideal bodies, we typically see them as the comic relief. It is rare to see an out of shape man have a leading role. Leanne  Dawson writes that "There are temporal, cultural and geographical ‘norms’ of gender and other aspects of identity, which are often incorrectly considered to be inherent or natural."

In the media, the ideal version of a man is seen as a strong, toned man. The idealized version of a woman is thin. Body evaluation is more commonly used to criticize women than men, and it can take different forms for men. For example, body evaluation is often directed at men's nonverbal cues. By contrast, women more often are subject to body evaluation in the form of sexual, sometimes offensive, verbal remarks. Men tend to experience this from other men, whereas women experience it from both sexes. The Interpersonal Sexual Objectification Scale (ISOS) is a scale that shows sexual objectification of respondents, both men and women. While experiencing sexual objectification it creates the need to constantly maintain and critique one's physical appearance. This leads to other things like eating disorders, body shaming, and anxiety. The ISOS scale can be related to objectification theory and sexism. Self-objectification, which is the way in which people evaluate themselves, is concentrated more on women.  Men typically experience it through media display.  To the extent that men do experience self-objectification, studies have shown that men typically do not experience its negative effects to the extent that women do.

In the media, sexual objectification has been used as a way to sell products to the general public. Sexual objectification has been used as a marketing strategy for many decades according to the Journal of Advertising. This specific strategy targets the public in selling products that will make them look and feel desirable and attractive. It is stated that this strategy sells well by grabbing the attention of the public. The journal states that explicit advertisements do better in marketing than other non-explicit ads.

Views on sexual objectification

While the concept of sexual objectification is important within feminist theory, ideas vary widely on what constitutes sexual objectification and what are the ethical implications of such objectification. Some feminists such as Naomi Wolf find the concept of physical attractiveness itself to be problematic, with some radical feminists  being opposed to any evaluation of another person's sexual attractiveness based on physical characteristics. John Stoltenberg goes so far as to condemn as wrongfully objectifying any sexual fantasy that involves the visualization of a woman.

Radical feminists view objectification as playing a central role in reducing women to what they refer to as the "oppressed sex class". While some feminists view mass media in societies that they argue are patriarchal as objectifying, they often focus on pornography as playing an egregious role in habituating men to objectify women.

Pro-feminist cultural critics such as Robert Jensen and Sut Jhally accuse mass media and advertising of promoting the objectification of women to help promote goods and services, and the television and film industries are commonly accused of normalizing the sexual objectification of women.

The objection to the objectification of women is not a recent phenomenon. In the French Enlightenment, for example, there was a debate as to whether a woman's breasts were merely a sensual enticement or rather a natural gift. In Alexandre Guillaume Mouslier de Moissy's 1771 play The True Mother (La Vraie Mère), the title character rebukes her husband for treating her as merely an object for his sexual gratification: "Are your senses so gross as to look on these breasts – the respectable treasures of nature – as merely an embellishment, destined to ornament the chest of women?"

The issues concerning sexual objectification became first problemized during the 1970s by feminist groups. Since then, it has been argued that the phenomenon of female sexual objectification has increased drastically since its problematization in all levels of life, and has resulted in negative consequences for women, especially in the political sphere. However, a rising form of new third-waver feminist groups have also taken the increased objectification of women as an opportunity to use the female body as a mode of power.
One study found that men exposed to media content in which women were objectified were more likely to accept those behaviors than men who were exposed to content where women were not objectified.

Some social conservatives have taken up aspects of the feminist critique of sexual objectification. In their view, however, the increase in the sexual objectification of both sexes in Western culture is one of the negative legacies of the sexual revolution. These critics, notably Wendy Shalit, advocate a return to pre-sexual revolution standards of sexual morality, which Shalit refers to as a "return to modesty", as an antidote to sexual objectification. Some social conservatives have argued that the feminist movement itself has contributed to the problem of the sexual objectification of women by promoting  "free" love (i.e. men and women choosing to have non-reproductive sex outside of marriage and for their own pleasure).

Others such as civil libertarians and sex-positive feminists contest feminist claims about the objectification of women. Camille Paglia holds that "[t]urning people into sex objects is one of the specialties of our species." In her view, objectification is closely tied to (and may even be identical with) the highest human faculties toward conceptualization and aesthetics. Individualist feminist Wendy McElroy says, given that  'objectification' of women means to make women into sexual objects; it is meaningless because, 'sexual objects', taken literally, means nothing because inanimate objects do not have sexuality. She continues that women are their bodies as well as their minds and souls, and so focusing on a single aspect should not be "degrading".  Feminist author Wendy Kaminer criticized feminist support for anti-pornography laws, arguing that pornography does not cause sexual violence, and bans on such material infantalize women. She has noted that radical feminists have often allied themselves with the Christian right in supporting these laws and denouncing the depiction of sex in popular culture although the two groups strongly disagree on virtually everything else. Her ACLU colleagues Nadine Strossen and Nan D. Hunter have made similar criticisms. Strossen has argued that objectification is not in and of itself dehumanizing, and may fulfill women’s own fantasies.  Psychologist Nigel Barber argues that men, and to a lesser extent, women, are naturally inclined to focus on the physical attractiveness of the opposite sex (or the same sex in the case of gays and lesbians), and that this has been widely misinterpreted as sexism.

Female self-objectification

Ariel Levy contends that Western women who exploit their sexuality by, for example, wearing revealing clothing and engaging in lewd behavior, engage in female self-objectification, meaning they objectify themselves. While some women see such behaviour as a form of empowerment, Levy contends that it has led to greater emphasis on a physical criterion or sexualization for women's perceived self-worth, which Levy calls "raunch culture". In a study conducted by the State University of New York, it is found that women self-objectify when trying to fit the "perfect" female standard according to the male gaze. 

Levy discusses this phenomenon in Female Chauvinist Pigs: Women and the Rise of Raunch Culture. Levy followed the camera crew from the Girls Gone Wild video series, and argues that contemporary America's sexualized culture not only objectifies women, it encourages women to objectify themselves. In today's culture, Levy writes, the idea of a woman participating in a wet T-shirt contest or being comfortable watching explicit pornography has become a symbol of feminist strength.

Jordan Peterson has asked why women need to wear make-up or high-heels in the workplace, that a double standard exists for sexual harassment and females who self-objectify themselves in society.

Social media has made a major impact on the self-objectification of women. Through social media, women self-objectify by posting provocative images that know will be objectified by their viewers as a form of seeking validation of posting images that fits the mold of society.

Latina women 
Latina women face a particular form of sexual objectification based on stereotypes relating to Latina women. American media often portrays Latina women as being sexually promiscuous and curvaceous, having large breasts and buttocks, being melodramatic, or having a feisty attitude. Keller identifies three main stereotypes that contribute to the objectification of Latinas. (Cantina Girl, Suffering Senorita, and Vamp). The “Cantina Girl” is characterized as being an alluring sexual presence. The “Suffering Senorita” is the Latina who goes “bad” due to her love of the (usually Anglo) love interest. Lastly, the “Vamp” is seen as beautiful but devious, and a psychological threat for her wit or charm. All three of these categorizations stem from the sexual objectification of Latina women's bodies and identities. 

Such sexual objectifications hold real-world consequences for Latina women. For instance, the prevalence of negative Latina stereotypes (such as hypersexualization) has led to a decrease in positive in-group attitudes among the Latina community.

Black women 
Black women have been fetishized and objectified throughout history. They may be portrayed as having a more animalistic nature than their non-black counterparts. People who fetishize black women are sometimes said to have "jungle fever".

Black women are widely objectified in the media and in pornography, and are scrutinized more closely for doing the same things as their non-black counterparts. They are also stereotyped in the media as having more curvaceous bodies and bigger lips.

Objectification theory

Objectification theory is a framework for understanding the experiences of women in cultures that sexually objectify them, proposed by Barbara Fredrickson and Tomi-Ann Roberts in 1997. Within this framework, Fredrickson and Roberts draw conclusions about women's experiences. This theory states that, because of sexual objectification, women learn to internalize an outsider's view of their bodies as the primary view of themselves. Women, they explain, begin to view their bodies as objects separate from their person. This internalization has been termed self-objectification. This theory does not seek to prove the existence of sexual objectification; the theory assumes its existence in culture. This self-objectification then, according to objectification theory, leads to increased habitual body monitoring. With this framework in mind, Fredrickson and Roberts suggest explanations for consequences they believe are the result of sexual objectification. The consequences suggested are: increased feelings of shame, increased feelings of anxiety, decreased peak motivational state, and decreased awareness of internal bodily states.

Sexual objectification has been studied based on the proposition that girls and women develop their primary view of their physical selves from observing others. These observations can take place in the media or through personal experience. Through a blend of expected and actual exposure, women are socialized to objectify their own physical characteristics from a third-person perception, which is identified as self-objectification. Women and girls develop an expected physical appearance for themselves, based on observations of others; and are aware that others are likely to observe as well. The sexual objectification and self-objectification of women is believed to influence social gender roles and inequalities between the sexes.

Self-objectification

Self-objectification can increase in situations which heighten the awareness of an individual's physical appearance. Here, the presence of a third-person observer is enhanced. Therefore, when individuals know others are looking at them, or will be looking at them, they are more likely to care about their physical appearance. Examples of the enhanced presence of an observer include the presence of an audience, camera, or other known observer.

Women, girls, and self-objectification
Primarily, objectification theory describes how women and girls are influenced as a result of expected social and gender roles. Research indicates not all women are influenced equally, due to the anatomical, hormonal, and genetic differences of the female body; however, women's bodies are often objectified and evaluated more frequently. Self-objectification in girls tends to stem from two main causes: the internalization of traditional beauty standards as translated through media as well as any instances of sexual objectification that they might encounter in their daily lives. It is not uncommon for women to translate their anxieties over their constant sense of objectification into obsessive self-surveillance. This, in turn, can lead to many serious problems in women and girls, including "body shame, anxiety, negative attitudes toward menstruation, a disrupted flow of consciousness, diminished awareness of internal bodily states, depression, sexual dysfunction, and disordered eating."

Sexual objectification occurs when a person is identified by their sexual body parts or sexual function. In essence, an individual loses their identity, and is recognized solely by the physical characteristics of their body. The purpose of this recognition is to bring enjoyment to others, or to serve as a sexual object for society. Sexual objectification can occur as a social construct among individuals.

Sexual objectification has been around and present in society for many but has increased with the introduction of social media according to “Objectification, Sexualization, and Misrepresentation: Social Media and the College Experience - Stefanie E Davis, 2018” This journal shows a clear explanation for how young girls are influenced by social media to be sexually objectified. The platform is meant to share a glimpse into a person's life through photos to share with friends, family and mutuals. For many individuals, social media applications like Instagram, Snapchat and Twitter are used to glamorize and romanticize certain lifestyles. Examples of this can be young women using their platform (however big it may be) to pose as an older age by uploading provocative photos. This behavior promotes sexual objectification of young girls that participate on social media.

Psychological consequences
Objectification theory suggests both direct and indirect consequences of objectification to women. Indirect consequences include self consciousness in terms that a woman is consistently checking or rearranging her clothes or appearance to ensure that she is presentable. More direct consequences are related to sexual victimization. Rape and sexual harassment are examples of this. Doob (2012) states that sexual harassment is one of the challenges faced by women in workplace. This may constitute sexual jokes or comments, most of which are degrading. Research indicates that objectification theory is valuable to understanding how repeated visual images in the media are socialized and translated into mental health problems, including psychological consequences on the individual and societal level. These include increased self-consciousness, increased body anxiety, heightened mental health threats (depression, anorexia nervosa, bulimia, and sexual dysfunction), and increased body shame. Therefore, the theory has been used to explore an array of dependent variables including disordered eating, mental health, depression, motor performance, body image, idealized body type, stereotype formation, sexual perception and sexual typing. Body shame is a byproduct of the concept of an idealized body type adopted by most Western cultures that depicts a thin, model-type figure. Thus, women will engage in actions meant to change their body such as dieting, exercise, eating disorders, cosmetic surgery, etc. Effects of objectification theory are identified on both the individual and societal levels.

Causes of depression
Learned helplessness theory posits that because human bodies are only alterable to a certain point, people develop a sense of body shame and anxiety from which they create a feeling of helplessness in relation to correcting their physical appearance and helplessness in being able to control the way in which others perceive their appearance. This lack of control often results in depression. In relating to a lack of motivation, objectification theory states that women have less control in relationships and the work environment because they have to depend on the evaluation of another who is typically basing their evaluation on physical appearance. Since the dependence on another's evaluation limits a woman's ability to create her own positive experiences and motivation, it adversely increases her likelihood for depression. Furthermore, sexual victimization may be a cause. Specifically, victimization within the workplace degrades women. Harassment experienced every day wears on a woman, and sometimes this results in a state of depression.

Alternatives and critique 
Ann J. Cahill uses the concept of derivitization as an alternative to objectification when trying to address sexual objectification's seeming judgment of all physical interactions (termed somatophobia by Cahill).  Cahill criticizes the notion of objectification as marginalizing the role of the body in ones subjective experience and therefore making it impossible to understand how being viewed as a sexually appealing body can enhance an individual's notion of self. 

Instead, Cahill uses the concept of subjectivity from the study of intersubjectivity. A subject IS an individual with their unique experience of reality. Derivitization is then defined as limiting another person's subjective behaviour and experience to align with or serve your own subjective experience. In this framing, the objectification exists in sex work is viewed instead as the derivitization of having another act for only one's own subjective experience and ignoring the sex worker's experience. Drawing comparisons to the doctor–patient relationship, Cahill argues that a recognition of what both people bring to a relationship and their subjective goals is what makes a relationship ethical.

See also

Dehumanization
Exploitation of women in mass media
Human furniture
Male gaze
Pornification
Rape culture
Sex in advertising
Sexuality in music videos
Sex in film

References

Further reading
 
   (BBC),  (pbk).
 
  
 
  Preview. [Link Broken]
  (conference paper)
 
 
 
  
 
 Mario Perniola, The Sex-appeal of the inorganic, translated by Massimo Verdicchio, London-New York, Continuum, 2004.

External links
 Papadaki, Evangelia (March 10, 2010), "Feminist perspectives on objectification", in 
 Shrage, Laurie (July 13, 2007), "Feminist perspectives on sex markets: 1.3 sexual objectification", in 
  – Sex-positive feminist perspective on sexual objectification.
  Interview with Janet Anderson.
 
Davis, Stefanie E (July 13, 2018) "Objectification, Sexualization and Misrepresentation: Social Media and the College Experience"  Sage Journals 
Bello, D. C., Pitts, R. E., & Etzel, M. J. (1983). The communication effects of controversial sexual content in television programs and commercials. Journal of Advertising, 12(3), 32-42.  
Hill, M. S., & Fischer, A. R. (2008). Examining objectification theory: Lesbian and heterosexual women's experiences with sexual-and self-objectification. The Counseling Psychologist, 36(5), 745-776. https://doi.org/10.1177/0011000007301669   

User generated content
 
 

Sexualization
Sexuality and society
Feminist terminology
Feminist theory
Philosophy of sexuality
Postmodern theory
Sexual attraction
Human sexuality
Sexual fetishism
Sexual ethics
Pornography